Henry S. Kariel (July 7, 1924 – July 8, 2004) was an American political scientist and author.

Books
The Decline of American Pluralism. 1961
Promise of politics. 1966 	
In search of authority: twentieth-century political thought. 1964. In over 500 libraries according to WorldCat
Open systems; arenas for political action. 1969 		
Political order; a reader in political science, edited by Henry S. Kariel. 1970 	
Approaches to the study of political science. Edited by Michael Haas and Henry S. Kariel. 1970 	
Frontiers of democratic theory. Edited by Henry S. Kariel. 1970 	
Saving appearances; the reestablishment of political science. 1972 	
Beyond liberalism, where relations grow. 1977 	
Desperate politics of postmodernism. 1989 	
Sources in twentieth-century political thought, edited by Henry S. Kariel.

References

1924 births
2004 deaths
American political scientists
University of California, Berkeley alumni
University of Hawaiʻi faculty
20th-century political scientists